The Gjegnalundsbreen glacier is located in Vestland county, Norway. The  glacier sits on the borders of the municipalities of Bremanger and Gloppen. The Nordfjorden and Hyefjorden are located just north and east of the glacier.

References

Glaciers of Vestland
Bremanger
Gloppen